Nganglam Gewog is a former gewog (village block) of Pemagatshel District, Bhutan. Nganglam Gewog is part of Nganglam Dungkhag, along with Dechenling and Norbugang Gewogs.

References

Former gewogs of Bhutan
Pemagatshel District